City of Cleveland may refer to:
 Cleveland, Ohio
 City of Cleveland (train), a streamliner operated by the New York, Chicago and St. Louis Railroad
 Any other city called "Cleveland", see Cleveland (disambiguation)